Baotou East railway station is a station of Jingbao Railway in Inner Mongolia. It was built in 1923 and was at one time the main railway station in Baotou. In 1956, the station was renamed "Baotou East".

See also
 List of stations on Jingbao railway

References

Railway stations in Inner Mongolia